St Maurice's High School is a Roman Catholic High School in the new town of Cumbernauld, Scotland. The catchment area serves the west side of Cumbernauld, Condorrat, Eastfield, Croy, Kilsyth and Moodiesburn. They also have young people from Glasgow, Chryston, Muirhead, Balloch, Abronhill, Carrickstone and Westerwood where parents have chosen to send their children to St Maurice's rather than other schools.

St. Maurice's has five associated primary schools: Holy Cross Primary, St. Helen's Primary, St. Patrick's Primary, Kilsyth Primary and St. Michael's Primary.

The students are grouped into five houses for assemblies, registration classes, school award ceremonies and sports days. These are named Benedict, John Paul, Boniface, Innocent and Francis after previous popes.

History
The name of St Maurice was chosen since he is the patron saint of the town of Bron in France, the 'twin-town' of Cumbernauld. The building was opened in 1975 and extended in 1981 to cope with the rising number of pupils. Most of the extension was destroyed in a malicious fire in 2003, but was subsequently refurbished. In 2018–2019, the school went under further refurbishment with the entrance of the school being completely rebuilt to improve the appearance of the front of the school. The school also had a complete overhaul of their fire safety system through the addition of new alarms and fire doors.

Facilities

The school teaches a wide variety of subjects, most of which are taught through first and second year. Some subjects are only taught as National 5 or Higher and above. Subjects include:
 English
 Maths 
 Performing Arts (Art, Music, Drama, photography)
 Social Subjects (History, Modern Studies, Geography, travel and tourism, RMPS)
 Technical (Graphics, Design and Manufacturing, Woodworking, metalwork, automotive, horticulture)
 Modern Languages (French, Spanish, Italian )
 Sciences (Biology, Chemistry, Physics)
 Health and Wellbeing (Home Economics, Physical Education)
 Computing (Computing, Admin, Business Education)

Notable former pupils 
Jon Fratelli (Scottish singer and lead vocalist and guitarist of the Fratellis)
Steve Kean (Scottish football manager and footballer)
Mark Griffin (Scottish politician)
Darren Barr (Scottish footballer)

References 

Catholic secondary schools in North Lanarkshire
Cumbernauld
1975 establishments in Scotland
Educational institutions established in 1975